Liu Sanjie or Third Sister Liu is a 1960 Chinese musical film about the legendary folk singer Liu Sanjie, directed by Su Li (苏里). The film features many Zhuang traditional songs and extraordinary Guangxi landscapes. The film also uses elements from traditional Chinese operas.

The film was screened in more than 50 countries, and was considered by Premier Zhou Enlai as a film that made a great contribution to China's cultural exchanges with foreign countries. Outside mainland China, it was first screened in Hong Kong.

Awards and nominations
1963 Hundred Flowers Awards
 Winner - Best Cinematography (Yin Zhi, Guo Zhenting)
 Winner - Best Original Score (Lei Zhenbang)
 Winner - Best Art Direction (Tong Jingwen, Zhang Qiwang)
 Nomination – Best Actress (Huang Wanqiu)

References

External links 

1960s Mandarin-language films
1960 films
1960 musical films
Films set in Guangxi
Culture in Guangxi
Chinese musical films